Hans-Joachim Rotzsch (25 April 1929 – 25 September 2013) was a German choral conductor, conducting the Thomanerchor from 1972 until 1991 as the fifteenth Thomaskantor since Johann Sebastian Bach. He was also a tenor and an academic teacher.

Biography 
Hans-Joachim Rotzsch was born in Leipzig and educated from 1940 to 1945 at the Musisches Gymnasium Frankfurt, directed by Kurt Thomas. In 1949 he began to study church music at the  Hochschule für Musik und Theater "Felix Mendelssohn Bartholdy" Leipzig, learning organ with Günther Ramin.

Rotzsch became known as an oratorio tenor. In 1972 he was appointed professor at the Felix Mendelssohn-Bartholdy Hochschule. From 1972 until 1991 he was the Thomaskantor, as the 15th successor of Bach in this position. He was a Stasi informer from 1973 onward.

In 1992 he became a guest professor for Protestant church music at the Mozarteum University of Salzburg, where he taught until 2000.

Literature 
 Kurt Meyer: Der Fünfzehnte nach Bach. Thomaskantor Hans Joachim Rotzsch; Schkeuditzer Buchverlag, 2002;

Recordings 
 Bach Made in Germany Vol. 1 – Cantatas II – Boy soprano, Hans-Joachim Rotzsch (tenor), Hans Hauptmann, Thomanerchor, Gewandhausorchester, conductor Günther Ramin, Leipzig Classics
 Bach: Ich hatte viel Bekümmernis, BWV 21, Arleen Augér, Peter Schreier, Siegfried Lorenz, Thomanerchor Leipzig, Neues Bachisches Collegium Musicum, 1981–83
 Bach: Der Himmel lacht! Die Erde jubilieret, BWV 31 / Erfreut euch, ihr Herzen, BWV 66, Helga Termer, Heidi Rieß, Eberhard Büchner, Siegfried Lorenz, Hermann Christian Polster, Thomanerchor, Gewandhausorchester

References

External links 
 Wir Salzburger geben unseren Thomaskantor nicht wieder her. interview in the Leipziger Volkszeitung, 4 June 1998 (in German)
 Ein Bastler – wie einst Bach "Leipzigs Thomaskantor Rotzsch dirigiert Paulus in Hamburg", Hamburger Abendblatt, 18 February 1988 (in German)
 Entries for Hans-Joachim Rotzsch on WorldCat

1929 births
2013 deaths
Musicians from Leipzig
German choral conductors
German male conductors (music)
German tenors
Academic staff of Leipzig University
Thomaskantors
Academic staff of Mozarteum University Salzburg
Recipients of the Art Prize of the German Democratic Republic
People of the Stasi